Mickey's Big Broadcast is a 1933 short film in Larry Darmour's Mickey McGuire series starring a young Mickey Rooney. Directed by Jesse Duffy, the two-reel short was released to theaters on June 6, 1933 by RKO Radio Pictures. An edited version of this short appeared in the feature film compilation "Mickey the Great".

Plot
Mickey and the gang try to participate in a local radio contest. But with Stinky Davis and his dad up to their old tricks, the gang are left out of the contest. Instead, they decide to start their own radio show in the clubhouse.

Cast
Mickey Rooney – Mickey McGuire
Billy Barty – Billy McGuire
Jimmy Robinson – Hambone Johnson
Marvin Stephens – Katrink
Delia Bogard – Tomboy Taylor
Douglas Fox – Stinkie Davis

External links 
 

1933 films
1933 comedy films
American black-and-white films
Mickey McGuire short film series
1933 short films
American comedy short films
1930s English-language films
1930s American films